Bekrić is a Bosnian surname. Notable people with the surname include:

Emir Bekrić (born 1991), Serbian hurdler
Liam Bekric (born 2001), Australian paralympic swimmer
Samir Bekrić (born 1985), Bosnian footballer

See also
Berić

Bosnian surnames